Snickers Gap, originally William's Gap, is a wind gap in the Blue Ridge Mountain on the border of Loudoun County and Clarke County in Virginia.  The gap is traversed by Virginia State Route 7.  The Appalachian Trail also passes across the gap.  Bear's Den and Raven Rocks are adjacent to the gap.

During the autumn bird migration the gap is a favored spot for birdwatchers to count and study the many raptors that follow the ridge on their way south.

Geography

Due to the dwindling height of the Blue Ridge as it approaches the Potomac River, Snickers Gap is one of the lowest wind gaps of the ridge in Virginia, with only Manassas Gap and the adjacent Keyes Gap being lower. The gap connects the northern Virginia piedmont with the lower Shenandoah Valley and serves as a main thoroughfare between the two regions.

History

The gap has been a major thoroughfare between the Piedmont and the Shenandoah Valley since before the European colonization of the area.  Native Americans originally cut a trail through the gap that continued to be used by white settlers.  The gap was known as Williams' Gap until the early 1780s, when the modern name began to be used. The gap derived its name from Edward Snickers, who owned the gap and surrounding land and operated a ferry across the Shenandoah River on the western side of the gap. By the late 18th century the Snickersville Turnpike and the Snickers Gap Turnpike were completed, and Snickers Gap became the main thoroughfare between Loudoun County and the Shenandoah, bypassing Keyes Gap, which to that point had been the preferred route.  The two turnpikes joined at Snickersville (present-day Bluemont) and then proceeded over the gap to Winchester.  The toll at the gap persisted well into the 20th century.  The Snickers Gap turnpike was eventually made into Virginia State Route 7, and the toll was dropped.  The gap was the scene of many small American Civil War skirmishes, and part of the Battle of Cool Spring (sometimes referred to as the "Battle of Snicker's Gap") took place there.

References

Further reading 
 Scheel, Eugene M. Loudoun Discovered: Communities and Corners and Crossroads Vol 4.  Friends of the Thomas Balch Library, Leesburg Va.  2002.

Landforms of Loudoun County, Virginia
Landforms of Clarke County, Virginia
Wind gaps of Virginia
Blue Ridge Mountains